The National Museum of Singapore is a public museum dedicated to Singaporean art, culture and history. Located within the country's Civic District at the Downtown Core area, it is the oldest museum in the country, with its history dating back to when it was first established in 1849, starting out as a section of a library at the Singapore Institution as the Raffles Library and Museum.

After several relocations over the next few decades, the museum moved to its current permanent site at Stamford Road in 1887. Between 1993 and March 2006, it was briefly known as the Singapore History Museum, before it subsequently returned to its present name that was first given in 1965. The museum preserves and interprets Singapore's social history, exploring the key events and people that have shaped the nation.

Over the centuries, the National Museum of Singapore has expanded and undergone various expansions and renovations, with the most recent being a three-and-a-half-year restoration that was completed on 2 December 2006, and was officially reopened on 7 December 2006 by former President of Singapore S. R. Nathan and the Minister for Information, Communications and the Arts Lee Boon Yang. The Singapore History Gallery would open on 8 December that same year.

It is one of six national museums in the country; the other five being the two Asian Civilisations Museums at Empress Place Building and Old Tao Nan School respectively, the Singapore Art Museum, Peranakan Museum as well as the National Gallery Singapore. The National Museum of Singapore is also one of the country's national monuments, having been designated as such in 1992 by the National Heritage Board. It is one of the largest museums in Asia. The National Museum of Singapore exhibits sculptures, objets d'art, paintings, drawings, and archaeological finds. Admission to the National Museum of Singapore is complimentary for Singaporean citizens and permanent residents.

History

Early years (1849–1887)

The museum was established in 1849 by the then Singapore Institution Committee.

Collection

In 2022, seats from Singapore Airlines’s  first  Airbus A380 were added to the museum's collection.

See also 
 List of museums in Singapore
 Museum Planning Area
National Treasures of Singapore

Notes

References

Works cited 

National Heritage Board, Archipelago Press, Singapore's 100 Historic Places (2002), 
Norman Edwards and Peter Keys, Times Books International (1996), Singapore: A Guide to Buildings, Streets and Places,

External links

Official website
Virtual tour of the National Museum of Singapore

 
1849 establishments in Singapore
Archaeological museums
Cultural infrastructure completed in 1887
Ethnographic museums in Asia
Government buildings completed in 1887
History museums
History of Singapore
Landmarks in Singapore
Museum Planning Area
Museums established in 1849
National monuments of Singapore
19th-century architecture in Singapore